Kasey Chambers is an Australian country music singer-songwriter who started her solo career in 1998 and released her first recording in 1999. Chambers has released twelve studio albums, The Captain (1999), Barricades & Brickwalls (2001), Wayward Angel (2004), Carnival (2006), Rattlin' Bones (2008), Kasey Chambers, Poppa Bill and the Little Hillbillies (2009), Little Bird (2010), Storybook (2011), Wreck & Ruin (2012), Bittersweet (2014), Dragonfly (2017) and Campfire (2018).

Chambers has won and been nominated for numerous music awards. They include fourteen Australian Recording Industry Association (ARIA) Awards and ten Australasian Performing Right Association (APRA) Awards. She was inducted into the ARIA Hall of Fame in 2018. This induction recognised her achievement of a "significant body of recorded work" and that she "has had a cultural impact within Australia". Chambers has also won awards in the country music field with nine from the Country Music Association of Australia (CMAA).

Awards

AIR Awards
The Australian Independent Record Awards (commonly known informally as AIR Awards) is an annual awards night to recognise, promote and celebrate the success of Australia's Independent Music sector.

|-
| AIR Awards of 2010
|Kasey Chambers, Poppa Bill and the Little Hillbillies
| Best Independent Country Album
| 
|-
| AIR Awards of 2011
|Little Bird 
| Best Independent Artist
| 
|-

APRA Music Awards 

These awards were established by Australasian Performing Right Association (APRA) in 1982 to honour the achievements of songwriters and music composers, and to recognise their song writing skills, sales and airplay performance, by its members annually. Since 1997 the association has formed an alliance with Australasian Mechanical Copyright Owners Society (AMCOS), which manages mechanical royalties, to present the awards. Kasey Chambers has won 10 APRA Music Awards out of 27 nominations.

|-
|rowspan="2"| 2000 ||rowspan="2"| "Cry Like a Baby" (Kasey Chambers) || Most Performed Country Work || 
|-
| Song of the Year || 
|-
| rowspan="2"| 2001 || rowspan="2"| "The Captain" (Chambers) || Most Performed Country Work || 
|-
| Song of the Year || 
|-
| rowspan="5"| 2002 || Kasey Chambers || Songwriter of the Year || 
|-
| rowspan="2"| "On a Bad Day" (Chambers) || Most Performed Country Work || 
|-
| Song of the Year || 
|-
| rowspan="2"| "Runaway Train" (Chambers, Steven Werchon) || Most Performed Country Work || 
|-
| Song of the Year || 
|-
| rowspan="5"| 2003 || rowspan="3"| "Not Pretty Enough" (Chambers) || Most Performed Australian Work || 
|-
| Most Performed Country Work || 
|-
| Song of the Year || 
|-
| "A Million Tears" (Chambers) || Most Performed Country Work || 
|-
| "If I Were You" (Chambers) || Most Performed Country Work || 
|-
| rowspan="2"| 2005 || "Hollywood" (Chambers) || Most Performed Country Work || 
|-
| "Like a River" (Chambers) || Most Performed Country Work || 
|-
| rowspan="3"| 2006 || "Hollywood" (Chambers) || Most Performed Country Work || 
|-
| "Pony" (Chambers) || Most Performed Country Work || 
|-
| "Saturated" (Chambers) || Most Performed Country Work || 
|-
| 2007 || "Nothing at All" (Chambers) || Most Performed Country Work || 
|-
| rowspan="2"| 2009 ||rowspan="2"| "Rattlin' Bones" (Chambers, Shane Nicholson || Country Work of the Year || 
|-
| Song of the Year || 
|-
| rowspan="2"| 2011 ||rowspan="2"| "Little Bird" (Chambers) || Country Work of the Year || 
|-
| Song of the Year || 
|-
|rowspan="2"|2012 ||rowspan="2"| "Beautiful Mess" (Chambers) || Country Work of the Year || 
|-
|Song of the Year || 
|-
|rowspan="2"| 2013 || "Adam and Eve" (Kasey Chambers and Shane Nicholson) ||rowspan="2"| Song of the Year || 
|-
| "The Quiet Life" (Kasey Chambers and Shane Nicholson) || 
|-
| 2015 || "Bittersweet" (Chambers, Bernard Fanning) || Song of the Year || 
|-
| 2016 || "Is God Real?" (Chambers) || Country Work of the Year || 
|-
| 2019 || "The Campfire Song" (Chambers) || Country Work of the Year || 
|-
| 2021
| "When We're Both Old and Mad" (Paul Kelly & Kasey Chambers)
| Song of the Year
| 
|-

ARIA Music Awards 

These awards have been presented by the Australian Record Industry Association (ARIA) since 1987. Kasey Chambers has won 14 ARIA Music Awards from 33 nominations, including her first win in 1999 for the Best Country Album for The Captain. As from November 2018, she has won that category nine times, she was also inducted into the ARIA Hall of Fame.

|-
|rowspan="2"| 1999 || rowspan="2"| The Captain || Best Country Album ||  
|-
| Best Female Artist ||  
|-
|rowspan="2"| 2000 || rowspan="2"| "The Captain" || Best Female Artist ||  
|-
| Single of the Year ||  
|-
|rowspan="7"| 2002 || rowspan="4"| Barricades & Brickwalls || Album of the Year ||  
|-
| Best Country Album ||  
|-
| Best Female Artist ||  
|-
| Highest Selling Album ||  
|-
| Barricades & Brickwalls – Campbell Murray Creating || Best Cover Art ||  
|-
| rowspan="2"| "Not Pretty Enough" || Highest Selling Single ||  
|-
| Single of the Year ||  
|-
| 2003 || Barricades & Brickwalls || Highest Selling Album ||  
|-
|rowspan="4"| 2004 || rowspan="3"| Wayward Angel || Album of the Year ||  
|-
| Best Country Album ||  
|-
| Best Female Artist ||  
|-
| Wayward Angel – Mathematics || Best Cover Art ||  
|-
| 2006 || "Nothing at All" || Best Female Artist ||  
|-
|rowspan="2"| 2007 || Carnival || Best Female Artist ||  
|-
| Carnival – Nash Chambers || Producer of the Year ||  
|-
|rowspan="3"| 2008 || rowspan="2"| Rattlin' Bones (by Kasey Chambers & Shane Nicholson) || Album of the Year ||  
|-
| Best Country Album ||  
|-
| Rattlin' Bones (by Kasey Chambers & Shane Nicholson) – Aaron Hayward & David Homer (Debaser) || Best Cover Art ||  
|-
| 2009 || Rattlin' Bones Max Sessions (by Kasey Chambers & Shane Nicholson) || Best Music DVD ||  
|-
| 2010 || Kasey Chambers, Poppa Bill and the Little Hillbillies (by Kasey Chambers, Poppa Bill and other family members) || Best Children's Album ||  
|-
|rowspan="2"| 2011 || rowspan="2"| Little Bird || Best Country Album ||  
|-
| Best Female Artist ||  
|-
| rowspan="2"|  2013 || Wreck & Ruin (by Kasey Chambers & Shane Nicholson) || Best Country Album || 
|-
| Wreck & Ruin  (by Kasey Chambers & Shane Nicholson) – Glen Hannah || Best Cover Artist ||  
|-
| rowspan="2"| 2014 ||rowspan="2"| Bittersweet || Best Country Album ||  
|-
| Best Female Artist ||  
|-
| 2017 || Dragonfly || Best Country Album || 
|-
| rowspan="2"|2018 || Kasey Chambers || ARIA Hall of Fame ||  
|-
| Campfire || Best Country Album ||  
|-

Country Music Awards of Australia
The Country Music Awards of Australia (CMAA) (also known as the Golden Guitar Awards) is an annual awards night held in January during the Tamworth Country Music Festival, in Tamworth, New South Wales, celebrating recording excellence in the Australian country music industry. Chambers has won twenty-four awards.

[note: wins only]

 
|-
| rowspan="2"| 2000
| rowspan="2"| The Captain
| Album of the Year
| 
|-
| Female Vocalist of the Year
| 
|-
| rowspan="2"| 2002
| "Not Pretty Enough"
| Song of the Year
| 
|-
| Barricades & Brickwalls
| Top Selling Album of the Year
| 
|-
| 2003
| herself
| Golden Guitar Winner of the Decade
| 
|-
| rowspan="3"| 2005
| "Pony"
| Female Vocalist of the Year
| 
|-
| "Like a River"
| Single of the Year
| 
|-
| '"Wayward Angel| Top Selling Album of the Year
| 
|-
| 2006
| "Pony"
| Single of the Year
| 
|-
| rowspan="5"| 2009
| rowspan="3"| "Rattlin' Bones" 
| Song of the Year
| 
|-
| Single of the Year
| 
|-
| Video Clip of the Year
| 
|-
| rowspan="2"| Rattlin' Bones 
| Highest Selling Album of the Year
| 
|-
| Album of the Year
| 
|-
| rowspan="4"| 2011
| rowspan="3"| "Little Bird" 
| Song of the Year
| 
|-
| Single of the Year
| 
|-
| Female Artist of the Year
| 
|-
| "Love Like a Hurricane" 
| Vocal Collaboration of the Year
| 
|-
| 2012
| "Millionaires" 
| Vocal Collaboration of the Year
| 
|-
| 2013
| "Adam & Eve" 
| Group or Duo of the Year
| 
|-
| 2015
| Bittersweet| Album of the Year
| 
|-
| 2017
| "F U Cancer" 
| Vocal Collaboration of the Year
| 
|-
| rowspan="2"| 2018
| Dragonfly| Alt Country Album of the Year
| 
|-
| herself || Australian Roll of Renown || 
|-
| 2019
| Campfire''
| Traditional Country Album of the Year
| 
|-

Mo Awards
The Australian Entertainment Mo Awards (commonly known informally as the Mo Awards), were annual Australian entertainment industry awards. They recognise achievements in live entertainment in Australia from 1975 to 2016. Chambers won two awards in that time.
 (wins only)
|-
| 1999
| Kasey Chambers 
| Female Country Entertainer of the Year
| 
|-
| 2001
| Kasey Chambers 
| Female Country Entertainer of the Year
| 
|-

National Live Music Awards
The National Live Music Awards (NLMAs) are a broad recognition of Australia's diverse live industry, celebrating the success of the Australian live scene. The awards commenced in 2016.

|-
| National Live Music Awards of 2019
| Kasey Chambers
| Live Country Act of the Year
| 
|-

Other awards

References

External links

 

Chambers, Kasey